Wangi is a 2019 Malaysian Malay-language psychological horror film. The film follows a woman who returns home after childbirth, but soon suffers stress as unnatural things happen on her house and children, all after her friend Bella who lives with her disappeared.

It was released on 5 September 2019 in Malaysia, Singapore and Brunei.

Synopsis
Nor and her husband, Khuzairi lives in a bungalow with their two kids. After giving birth to second child, Nor returns home and her mother comes to take care of her. She notices that her maid, Bella has disappeared. Bella is like a younger sister to Nor and she lives with them. Her husband says that Bella has returned to Amsterdam to get married. Nor suspects and soon her children start to have unnatural behaviours. Their first child likes to talk to himself and sleeps at random place; her husband hides secret while an old women always warns Nor. Unaware to Nor, the vanished Bella might be lurking in the dark corners of the bungalow.

Cast
Erra Fazira as Nor
Nabila Huda as Bella
Sharnaaz Ahmad as Khuzairi
Mia Nasir as Mia
Syazwan Zulkifly as Azlan
Nik Adam Mika as Khiri
Ruminah Sidek as Bella grandmother

References

External links

Wangi on Cinema.com.my

Malaysian horror films
2019 films